Miguel Gellert Krigsner is a Bolivian-Brazilian entrepreneur. He is the founder of the Brazilian company O Boticário, the second major cosmetic company in the Southern Hemisphere (Natura is the first). Krigsner is also the founder of the Fundação de Proteção à Natureza, one of the main Brazilian environmental NGOs. He also helped for the creation of the Holocaust Museum in Curitiba.

He was born in Bolivia into a Jewish family from La Paz. Born to Jacob Krigsner, a Polish Jew, and to Anneliese Krigsner, a German Jew. The Krigsners left Bolivia and moved to Brazil when Miguel was 11 years old, settling in the city of Curitiba.

References

Bolivian Jews
Bolivian emigrants to Brazil
Bolivian businesspeople
Bolivian people of German-Jewish descent
Bolivian people of Polish-Jewish descent
Brazilian people of German-Jewish descent
Brazilian people of Polish-Jewish descent
Brazilian businesspeople
Brazilian Jews
Naturalized citizens of Brazil
People from La Paz
Living people
Year of birth missing (living people)